Meriel Buchanan  (5 September 1886 – 6 Feb 1959) was a British memorialist. The daughter of the last British Ambassador to Imperial Russia, she wrote a number of articles and books about her experiences during that time, most notably: Recollections of imperial Russia (1923) and Ambassador's daughter (1958).

Life 
Meriel Buchanan was the only child of Sir George Buchanan (1854-1924), and his wife Lady Georgina Meriel Bathurst (1863-1922).  As her father was a career diplomat, Meriel's early life was spent in the many countries where her father was posted: Hesse, Baden, Bulgaria, Germany, Italy, the Netherlands and Luxembourg.
During World War I, Meriel and her family remained in Russia. Her mother took charge of the organization of a hospital where Meriel worked as a nurse. Her father remained as the British Ambassador even after the fall of the Romanovs. The family left Russia in January 1918.

Meriel's two novels, published before the war, were not a success. She then turned to non-fiction, writing  a number of books about the Romanov family, the Russian nobility and her experiences living in Russia during the last years of the reign of Tsar Nicholas II, beginning with Petrograd, the city of trouble, 1914-1918, published in 1918.

She married in 1925 Major Harold Wilfred Knowling of the Welsh Guards (d. 1954), and had one son: Michael George Alexander Knowling (b 1929). In 1958, the year before her death,  she published an account of her father's diplomatic career under the title Ambassador's Daughter.

Books 
White Witch (London: Herbert Jenkins, 1913)
Tania. A Russian story (London: Herbert Jenkins, 1914)
Petrograd, the city of trouble, 1914-1918 (London: W. Collins, 1918)
Recollections of imperial Russia (London: Hutchinson & Co., 1923)
Diplomacy and foreign courts (London, Hutchinson, 1928)
The dissolution of an empire (London: John Murray, 1932; reprinted New York: Arno Press, 1971)
Anne of Austria: The Infanta Queen (London: Hutchinson & Co., 1937)
The Great Mademoiselle (London: Hutchinson & Co., 1938)
Queen Victoria's relations  (London: Cassell, 1954)
Good Food from the Balkans  (London: Frederick Muller Limited, 1956)
Victorian gallery (London: Cassell, 1956)
Ambassador's daughter (London: Cassell, 1958)

Notes

References
Cross, Anthony .  In the Lands of the Romanovs : An Annotated Bibliography of First-Hand English-Language Accounts of the Russian Empire (1613-1917) . Open Book Publishers, 2014 . .
Firkatian, Mari A.   Diplomats and Dreamers: The Stancioff Family in Bulgarian History. UPA, 2008.  
McCarthy, Helen.  Women of the World: The Rise of the Female Diplomat. Bloomsbury Publishing PLC;  2014. 

 Sullivan, Michael John. A Fatal Passion: The Story of the Uncrowned Last Empress of Russia, Random House, 1997, 
 Van der Kiste, John. Princess Victoria Melita .Sutton Publishing, 1991.

External links
 

1886 births
1959 deaths
20th-century British women writers
20th-century British writers
British expatriates in the Russian Empire